Chasmodes is a small genus of combtooth blennies found in the western Atlantic Ocean.

Species
There are currently three recognized species in this genus:
 Chasmodes bosquianus (Lacépède, 1800) (Striped blenny)
 Chasmodes longimaxilla J. T. Williams, 1983 (Stretchjaw blenny)
 Chasmodes saburrae D. S. Jordan & C. H. Gilbert, 1882 (Florida blenny)

References

 
Salarinae